Thornewood Open Space Preserve is a small regional park located in the  Santa Cruz Mountains in San Mateo County. The park lies in the San Francisco Bay Area and is operated by the Midpeninsula Regional Open Space District. The Schilling Lake Trail leads to Schilling Lake, a protected wildlife habitat. This trail offers brief views of the southern San Francisco Bay, Palo Alto (including Stanford University's Hoover Tower) and surrounding cities, and the Diablo Range. From Schilling Lake, the Bridle Trail leads to Old La Honda Road.

The Sierra Club donated this land to the Midpeninsula Regional Open Space District in 1978, after brief management of its old estate. The name Thornewood comes from Julian and Edna Thorne, who developed the land in the 1920s. The Thornes built a house designed by Gardner Daily and surrounded it with extensive gardens. Those gardens included Schilling Lake, named after the nearby August Schilling land. The Thorne and Schilling estates were both part of Rancho Cañada de Raymundo in old California.

Second-growth redwood trees grow in portions of Thornewood Open Space Preserve, especially by the lake. There are false brome grasses throughout the area.

Bibliography
 
 
 

Protected areas of San Mateo County, California
Regional parks in California
Midpeninsula Regional Open Space District
Nature reserves in California